Litfiba 3 is the third studio album from the Italian rock band Litfiba that ends the "Trilogy of power" started with first album Desaparecido. It is the last album on which new wave influences can be heard.

Lyrics deal much with social and political criticism. "Louisiana" is about the death penalty and doubts about guilt, through the example of sentenced Willie Jasper Darden (depicted in the cover). "Santiago" is about Pope John Paul II's visit to Chilean dictator Augusto Pinochet. "Tex" is about the genocide of Native Americans.

Track listing
"Santiago" – 3:38
"Amigo" – 3:20
"Louisiana" – 5:32
"Ci sei solo tu" – 4:58
"Paname" – 4:57
"Cuore di vetro" – 4:55
"Tex" – 3:33
"Peste" – 5:30
"Corri" – 3:49
"Bambino" – 5:16

Some editions for export outside Italy also contains 5 live bonus tracks and a different front cover :

11. "Come un dio" – 8:05
12. "Resta" – 3:00
13. "Apapaia" – 4:59
14. "Re del silenzio" – 5:21
15. "Tziganata" – 4:35

Personnel
Piero Pelù – Vocals
Ghigo Renzulli – Guitars
Ringo de Palma – Drums
Antonio Aiazzi – Keyboards
Gianni Maroccolo – Bass
Candelo Cabezas – Percussions
Francesco Magnelli – Piano
Guido Guidoboni – Harmonica
Francesca Mariotti – Castanets
Daniele Trambusti – Percussions

Certifications and sales

References

External links

Litfiba albums
1988 albums
EMI Records albums